In the 1976–77 season Panathinaikos played for 18th consecutive time in Greece's top division, the Alpha Ethniki. They also competed in the Balkans Cup, being the winners, and the Greek Cup.

Squad

Competitions

Alpha Ethniki

Classification

Greek Cup

Final 
The 35th Greek Cup Final was played at the Georgios Karaiskakis Stadium, Piraeus.

References

External links
 Panathinaikos FC official website

Panathinaikos F.C. seasons
Panathinaikos
Greek football championship-winning seasons